Howard Becker may refer to:
 Howard P. Becker (1899–1960), U.S. sociologist
 Howard S. Becker (born 1928), U.S. sociologist